M 1-42 is a planetary nebula located in the constellation of Sagittarius, 10 000 light-years away from Earth.

The nebula has been nicknamed the "Eye of Sauron Nebula" due to its resemblance to the Lord of the Rings film artifact.

References

Planetary nebulae
Sagittarius (constellation)